The Bears Ears are a pair of buttes located in San Juan County in southeastern Utah, United States. They are protected as part of and the namesake of the Bears Ears National Monument, managed by the Bureau of Land Management and United States Forest Service. The Bears Ears are bordered on the west by Dark Canyon Wilderness and Beef Basin, on the east by Comb Ridge and on the north by Indian Creek and Canyonlands National Park.

See also

 List of mountains in Utah

References

Further reading
 Regina Lopez-Whiteskunk, The fight for Bears Ears, on the road, High Country News (October 31, 2016)
 Jonathan Thompson, The bid for Bears Ears, High Country News (October 16, 2016)

External links

 Bears Ears at USGS website

Buttes of Utah
Landforms of San Juan County, Utah
Bears Ears National Monument